Hesychotypa maculosa is a species of beetle in the family Cerambycidae. It was described by Henry Walter Bates in 1865. It is known from Brazil.

References

maculosa
Beetles described in 1865